Von Carlowitz may refer to the following people from Saxony:

 Adolph von Carlowitz (1858–1928), German army commander in the First World War.
 Hans Carl von Carlowitz (1645–1714), Saxon mining official and father of sustainable forestry.
 John of Carlowitz (1527–1578), Saxon official and instigator of the Pig War.